Gnorimoschema brachiatum is a moth in the family Gelechiidae. It was described by Povolný in 1998. It is found in North America, where it has been recorded from Colorado, Saskatchewan, Washington and Yukon.

The length of the forewings is about 5.5 mm. The forewing pattern consists of a broad elongate blackish stripe with white or whitish on the dorsal forewing margin and partly on the costal margin. The apex is covered by a mixture of blackish and whitish scales. The hindwings are covered by a mixture of grey and blackish scales.

References

Gnorimoschema
Moths described in 1998